Cadson Bury is an Iron Age hillfort about  south-west of Callington, in Cornwall, England.

It is owned by the National Trust, and it is scheduled monument.

Description
The fort is sited in a commanding position on a steep hill, called Cadson Bury Down, above the River Lynher.

It is univallate, probably of the early Iron Age.

There are no traces of house platforms within the enclosure. There are two opposed inturned entrances on the east and west sides; the eastern entrance is clearly defined, the western entrance less so. Another entrance on the south may not be original.

See also

 Hillforts in Britain

References

Hill forts in Cornwall
Scheduled monuments in Cornwall
National Trust properties in Cornwall